Grammatobothus is a genus of small lefteye flounders native to the Indo-Pacific.

Species
There are currently three recognized species in this genus:
 Grammatobothus krempfi Chabanaud, 1929 (Krempf's flounder)
 Grammatobothus pennatus (J. D. Ogilby, 1913) (Pennant flounder)
 Grammatobothus polyophthalmus (Bleeker, 1865) (Threespot flounder)

References

Bothidae
Marine fish genera
Taxa named by John Roxborough Norman